Balesin Island is a tropical island and barangay off the eastern coast of Luzon in the Philippines. It is located in Lamon Bay and is administered as part of the municipality of Polillo of Quezon province.

Geography

Climate
The weather of Balesin Island is dominated by the trade winds, creating two seasons. The amihan (northeast monsoon) brings moderate temperatures, little or no rainfall, and a prevailing wind from the east. Typically it begins in November or December and ends sometime in May or June. Throughout rest of the year, Balesin Island experiences the habagat (southwest monsoon) season, characterized by hot and humid weather, frequent heavy rainfall, and a prevailing wind from the west. The island is periodically subject to severe tropical storms.

History
During the Japanese occupation of the Philippines, a contingent of seven soldiers lived on Balesin Island, reportedly existing peacefully with indigenous local fishermen and their families.

Balesin Island was once owned by businessman Baby Ysmael. The island was later acquired from Ysmael by Edgardo “Ed” Tordesillas, who began to develop it with basic facilities for tourism. Early customers were predominantly Japanese. Today Balesin Island is a property of Alphaland Corporation, a private company majority owned by its Chairman Roberto Ongpin, a prominent Filipino businessman.

Balesin Island Club
Around 10% of the island has been developed to create a luxury resort, Balesin Island Club, with membership fees reportedly in the range ₱2.4-4 million.

The resort was master-planned to optimise ecological sustainability. Runoff from the 1.5 km runway of Balesin Airport provides over 100 million liters of water annually which passes through several man-made lakes and filtration to provide potable water. In addition used water is recycled for landscaping during the summer. The island's coral reefs are managed for diving and sustainable fishing with local species including parrotfish, butterfly fish, yellowfin tuna, mahi-mahi, grouper, and deep-sea crabs.

Transportation
The island is served by the E.L. Tordesillas Airport, also known as Balesin Airport which has a  runway. Balesin is served by buses, jeeps, electric golf carts, and service vans around the island.

See also
Polillo Islands

References

External links

 Official website of Balesin Island Club

Islands of Quezon
Barangays of Quezon
Resorts in the Philippines
Private islands of the Philippines